Nakhon Ratchasima V-One Futsal Club (Thai alphabet สโมสรฟุตซอลนครราชสีมา เดอะมอลล์ วี-วัน) is a Thailand futsal club based in Nakhon Ratchasima Province. The club plays in the Thailand Futsal League.

External links 
 Nakhonratchasima The Mall V-ONE Futsal Club
 "เปิดตัว'สโมสรนครราชสีมาวี-วันฟุตซอล"

Futsal clubs in Thailand
Nakhon Ratchasima province